Bàsquet Club Andorra S.A., also known as MoraBanc Andorra for sponsorship reasons, is a professional basketball team that is based in Andorra la Vella, Andorra. Though based in Andorra, the club plays in the Spanish basketball league system. The team plays in the LEB Oro with home games played at the Poliesportiu d'Andorra.

From 1992 to 1996, BC Andorra played in the top league, the Liga ACB and also the Korać Cup during the 1995–96 season. After being relegated and playing one season in LEB league, the club resigned to its berth and came back to regional competitions. The club returned to Liga ACB in 2014, 18 years after its last appearance.

History 
On 12 June 1970 the club was founded as Club de Basket Les Escaldes, and changed its name to Bàsquet Club Andorra on 12 April 1971.

BC Andorra began playing in the regional competitions of Lleida, being promoted in the 1975–76 season to Primera Catalana. The following season the club resigned the category due to financial problems, but achieved a promotion again during the 1980–81 season. The club was promoted to the Spanish Third Division at the end of 1981–82 season and the Spanish Second Division during the 1983–84 season. In the 1985–86 season, Andorra reached the Primera Division B after 6 seasons and won the promotion to the Liga ACB, where BC Andorra remained four seasons. During the 1995–96 season the Andorran club participated in the Korać Cup. In 1996, the club was relegated to LEB and in the following seasons, competed at the low levels of Catalonia and Spain until 2009–10, when BC Andorra participated in the LEB Plata.

In the 2012–13 season, BC Andorra participated in the LEB Oro, the second division of the Spanish basketball, reaching the play-off final promotion to the Liga ACB and being finalist of the Copa Príncipe.

The following season the Andorran club achieved the Copa Príncipe and the promotion to the top league of Spain after becoming winners of the 2013–14 LEB Oro.

In 2017, Andorra qualified for the first time since 22 years to the ACB playoffs, where they were eliminated in the quarterfinals by Real Madrid. This allowed the Andorrans to come back to the European competitions in the 2017–18 season, as the club registered in the EuroCup. After a first experience where the club was eliminated in the first round, Andorra reached the semifinals in their second participation.

Support 
BC Andorra is one of the most followed club of Andorra with approximately 1,200 associates and a reference of the Andorran basketball. In 2014 was founded the first official fan-club supporter Penya Tricolor. Some notable club supporters include Albert Llovera, Joaquim Rodríguez, José Luis Llorente, Roberto Dueñas or Cédric Gracia.

Presidents 
Joan Alay: Honorary president (Founder)
Magí Maestre: 1970–71 (Founder)
Eduard Molné: 1971–90 (Founder)
Carles Fiñana: 1990–94
Manel Arajol: 1994–2007
Gorka Aixàs: 2007–present

Sponsorship naming 
BC Andorra has had several sponsorship names over the years:
Festina Andorra: 1991–96
Quick Andorra: 2000–02
River Andorra: 2002–13
River Andorra MoraBanc: 2013–14
MoraBanc Andorra: 2014–present

Uniforms

Players

Current roster

Depth chart

Season by season

Trophies and awards

Trophies 
2nd division championships: (2)
1ª División B: (1) 1992
LEB Oro: (1) 2014
3rd division championships: (1)
LEB Plata: (1) 2012
Lliga Catalana: (2)
2018, 2020
Lliga Catalana LEB Oro: (1)
2013
Lliga Catalana LEB Plata: (1)
2010
Lliga Catalana EBA: (3)
1989, 1990, 1992
Copa Príncipe: (1)
2014
Trofeo Ciutat de Valencia: (1)
2017

Individual awards 
LEB Oro MVP
Jordi Trias – 2014
All-ACB First Team
Giorgi Shermadini – 2017
All LEB Oro First Team
Marc Blanch – 2013, 2014
Jordi Trias – 2014

Notable players 

 Xavier Mujal
 Carlos Farfán
  David Navarro
 Pere Práxedes
 Thomas Schreiner
 Quino Colom (youth teams)
 José Luis Llorente
 Josep Maria Margall
 Víctor Sada
 Jordi Trias
 Enrique Villalobos
 Giorgi Shermadini
 Beka Burjanadze
 Georgios Bogris
 Thanasis Antetokounmpo
 Vojdan Stojanovski
 José "Piculín" Ortiz
 Eric Anderson
 Rickey Brown
 Dan Godfread
 Conner Henry
 Jerrod Mustaf
 Andy Toolson
 David Jelinek
 Andrew Albicy

References

External links 
 Official website 
 BC Andorra at ACB.com 

Basketball in Andorra
Former LEB Oro teams
Liga ACB teams
1970 establishments in Andorra
Basketball teams established in 1970
Sports clubs in Andorra